Hidden Tear is the first open-source ransomware trojan that targets computers running Microsoft Windows The original sample was posted in August 2015 to GitHub by a Kurdish security researcher.

When Hidden Tear is activated, it encrypts certain types of files using a symmetric AES algorithm, then sends the symmetric key to the malware's control servers. However, as CordueneWarez claimed "All my malware codes are backdoored on purpose", Hidden Tear has an encryption backdoor, thus allowing him to crack various samples.

References

2015 in computing
Computer viruses
Trojan horses